Pakalkkinavu is a 1966 Indian Malayalam-language film, directed by S. S. Rajan and produced by N. R. Vaidyanadhan. The film stars Sathyan, Sharada, Adoor Bhasi and Nilambur Balan.

Cast

Sathyan as Babu
Sharada as Malathi
Nellikode Bhaskaran as Chandran 
Adoor Bhasi as Krishnankutty
Vasanthi as Shari
Nilambur Balan
Rajakolila
Baby Sreelatha as Thankamani
Balan Pallippattu
Kaduvakulam Antony as Kittunni
Kunjava as Shankaran
Latha Raju as Ammini
M. S. Namboothiri as Kurup
Premji as Master
Krishnankutty

Soundtrack
The music was composed by B. A. Chidambaranath with lyrics by P. Bhaskaran.

References

External links
 

1966 films
1960s Malayalam-language films